The Seasonal Attribution Project is a climate'prediction.net sub-project, with support from the WWF.  It runs a high resolution model in order to try to determine the extent to which extreme weather events are attributable to human-induced global warming.

The project did cease giving out more work, however there has been a project extension to try a fourth sea surface temperature pattern. Current work will still be accepted and used for collaborations and possibly revisions of papers during the review process.

A further extension will start soon.

The experiments
United Kingdom floods of Autumn 2000 – Current project.
Mountain snowpack decline in western North America Developed in collaboration with the Climate Impacts Group at the University of Washington.
Heatwave occurrence in South Africa and India

The latter two will use the same models. Information has been uploaded but analysis of information generated has not yet started.

See also
Effects of global warming

References

External links
Seasonal Attribution Website

Science in society
Free science software
Numerical climate and weather models
Volunteer computing projects

de:Seasonal Attribution Project